Koya may refer to:

Places

Iraq
 Koya;, a town in Iraqi Kurdistan
 Koya University, a university in that town

Japan
 Mount Kōya, a mountain in Japan
 Kōya, Wakayama, a town on the top of Mount Kōya
 Kōya Station (Tokyo), a train station in Adachi, Tokyo, Japan
 Nankai Kōya Line, a railway line in Osaka and Wakayama Prefectures between Osaka and Koyasan

Sierra Leone
 Kingdom of Koya, a pre-colonial African state in what is now northern Sierra Leone
 Koya, Sierra Leone, a village in Sierra Leone

People and languages
 Koya (name), a given name and surname
 Koya (Malabar), a Muslim community in south India
 Gyele people, Cameroonian pygmies
 Kola people, Gabonese pygmies
 Koya language, a language spoken in India
 Koya (tribe), a scheduled tribe in India, speakers of the Koya language
 Koya, ring name of Indian professional wrestler Mahabali Shera
 Koyah (fl. 1787 – 1795), Haida chief in British Columbia

Other uses
KOYA, radio station in South Dakota, United States
Koya score, a tiebreaker criterion for group tournaments

Language and nationality disambiguation pages